Sir George Laurence Gomme, FSA (18 December 1853 – 23 February 1916) was a public servant and leading British folklorist. He helped found both the Victoria County History and the Folklore Society. He also had an interest in old buildings and persuaded the London County Council to take up the blue plaque commemorative scheme.

Life
Gomme was born in the London district of Stepney, the second of ten children of William Laurence Gomme (1828–1887), an engineer, and his wife Mary (1831–1921). He attended the City of London School to the age of sixteen, when he started work, first with a railway company, then with the Fulham board of works, finally, in 1873, with the Metropolitan Board of Works: he remained with it and its successor, the London County Council, until his retirement in 1914. His position as statistical officer, from 1893, and then as clerk to the council, from 1900, gave him a major role in policy and administration.

His interests included folklore and history. The former he shared with his wife, Alice Bertha Gomme, born Alice Merck (1853–1938), whom he married on 31 March 1875. The couple had seven sons, including Arthur Allan Gomme, a librarian and historian of technology, and Arnold Wycombe Gomme, a noted classical scholar. 

Both Gomme and his wife were founder members of the Folklore Society in 1878; and Gomme went on to be its honorary secretary, director and president. Gomme wrote many books and articles on folklore, including Primitive Folk Moots (1880), Folklore Relics of Early Village Life (1883), Ethnology in Folklore (1892) and Folklore as a Historical Science (1908).  His work in the field is now generally regarded as too dependent on a survivals theory, which tried to trace folk customs back to earlier stages of civilisation; but it retains value as a collection. 

His historical writings show a particular interest in the history of London, in books such as The Governance of London (1907) and The Making of London (1912). He was also one of the founders of the Victoria County History project, and had a passion for old buildings. He used his council position to protect threatened buildings and to advance the Survey of London, to which he also contributed historical material. Another overlap of his historical and professional interests was the blue plaque commemorative scheme, which he persuaded the council to take on in 1901: the 800th blue plaque to be awarded would later mark his own London residence in 24 Dorset Square.

He was knighted in 1911. Not long afterwards, in 1914, ill health caused him to retire early; and he died of pernicious anemia on 23 February 1916 at his country home in Long Crendon, Buckinghamshire.

Notes

References
Alice Bertha Gomme, "Bibliography of the Writings of the Late Sir Laurence Gomme on Anthropology and Folklore", Folklore 27 (1916), 408–13
Robert Gomme, "Gomme, Sir (George) Laurence (1853–1916)", Oxford Dictionary of National Biography, Oxford: OUP, 2004 subscription needed (online version accessed 6 Dec 2008)
Jacqueline Simpson and Steve Roud, "Gomme, George Laurence", A Dictionary of English Folklore, Oxford: OUP 2000, 149–50. .

External links

 
 
 Clodd, Edward, "Sir George Laurence Gomme", Folk-Lore, Volume 27 (1916) pp. 111–112
Founder of VCH honoured with 800th Blue Plaque, Victoria County History news release on Gomme's blue plaque
English Heritage Celebrates 800th Blue Plaque, English Heritage news release on Gomme's blue plaque

English folklorists
People from Stepney
Deaths from pernicious anemia
Knights Bachelor
1853 births
1916 deaths
Presidents of the Folklore Society